I'm a Man is a 1918 American short comedy film directed by King Vidor.

Cast
 Martin Pendleton

Plot
A boy (Pendleton) demonstrates that his German-American family is more loyal to the United States than a devious French immigrant.

References

External links

1918 films
1918 short films
Films directed by King Vidor
American silent short films
1918 comedy films
American black-and-white films
American comedy short films
1910s American films
Silent American comedy films